was the 4th Ōta daimyō of Kakegawa Domain in Tōtōmi Province, (modern-day Shizuoka Prefecture) in mid-Edo period Japan.

Biography
Ōta Suketoki was the fourth son of Ōta Sukeyoshi, the 2nd Ōta daimyō of Kakegawa Domain, by a concubine. As his elder brother Ōta Sukenobu died in 1808 without a male heir, he inherited the leadership of the Ōta clan and position of daimyō of Kakegawa.

However, Ōta Suketoki died only two years later at the relatively young age of 42. Although he was married to a daughter of Makino Tadakiyo, daimyō of Nagaoka Domain in Echigo Province, he had only one daughter, and the domain passed to his son-in-law on his death.

His grave is at the Ōta clan temple of Myōhokke-ji in Mishima, Shizuoka.

References 
 Appert, Georges and H. Kinoshita. (1888).  Ancien Japon. Tokyo: Imprimerie Kokubunsha.
 Papinot, Edmond. (1906) Dictionnaire d'histoire et de géographie du japon. Tokyo: Librarie Sansaisha...Click link for digitized 1906 Nobiliaire du japon (2003)
 The content of much of this article was derived from that of the corresponding article on Japanese Wikipedia.

Fudai daimyo
Suketoki
1769 births
1810 deaths